Lesticus stefanschoedli is a species of ground beetle in the subfamily Pterostichinae. It was described by Kirschenhofer in 2005.

References

Lesticus
Beetles described in 2005